The 3000 and 5000 metres distances for women in the 2010–11 ISU Speed Skating World Cup were contested over six races on six occasions, out of a total of eight World Cup occasions for the season, with the first occasion taking place in Heerenveen, Netherlands, on 12–14 November 2010, and the final occasion also taking place in Heerenveen on 4–6 March 2011.

Martina Sáblíková of the Czech Republic successfully defended her title from the previous season, while Stephanie Beckert of Germany repeated her second place, and Jilleanne Rookard of the United States came third.

Sábliková set a new world record on the 5000 metres in the Salt Lake City event on 18 February 2011.

Top three

Race medallists

Standings
Standings as of 6 March 2011 (end of the season).

References

Women 3000
ISU